Bakatin is a Russian masculine surname; its feminine counterpart is Bakatina. Notable people with the surname include:

 Aleksandr Bakatin (1922–1977), Russian diver
 Vadim Bakatin (1937–2022), Soviet politician

Russian-language surnames